Macon County is a county located in the northern portion of the U.S. state of Missouri. As of the 2020 census, the population was 15,209. Its county seat is Macon. The county was organized January 6, 1837, and named for Nathaniel Macon, a Revolutionary War hero and North Carolina politician.

Geography

Adjacent counties
Adair County (north)
Knox County (northeast)
Sullivan County (northwest)
Shelby County (east)
Randolph County (south)
Monroe County (southeast)
Chariton County (southwest)
Linn County (west)

Major highways
 U.S. Route 36
 U.S. Route 63
 Route 3
 Route 149
 Route 156

Townships
 Bevier
 Callao
 Chariton
 Drake
 Eagle
 Easley
 Hudson
 Independence
 Jackson
 Johnston
 La Plata
 Liberty
 Lingo
 Lyda
 Middle Fork
 Morrow
 Narrows
 Richland
 Round Grove
 Russell
 Ten Mile
 Valley
 Walnut Creek
 White

Demographics

As of the census of 2010, there were 15,556 people, 6,501 households, and 4,381 families residing in the county.  The population density was 20 people per square mile (8/km2).  There were 7,502 housing units at an average density of 9 per square mile (4/km2).  The racial makeup of the county was 96.18% White, 2.21% Black or African American, 0.39% Native American, 0.16% Asian, 0.01% Pacific Islander, 0.22% from other races, and 0.83% from two or more races. Approximately 0.77% of the population were Hispanic or Latino of any race. 22.8% were of German, 21.8% American, 13.9% English and 10.8% Irish ancestry.

There were 6,501 households, out of which 29.10% had children under the age of 18 living with them, 55.70% were married couples living together, 8.40% had a female householder with no husband present, and 32.60% were non-families. 29.00% of all households were made up of individuals, and 15.00% had someone living alone who was 65 years of age or older.  The average household size was 2.38 and the average family size was 2.92.

In the county, the population was spread out, with 24.20% under the age of 18, 7.50% from 18 to 24, 25.30% from 25 to 44, 23.90% from 45 to 64, and 19.00% who were 65 years of age or older.  The median age was 40 years. For every 100 females there were 95.40 males.  For every 100 females age 18 and over, there were 90.50 males.

The median income for a household in the county was $30,195, and the median income for a family was $36,370. Males had a median income of $26,408 versus $18,275 for females. The per capita income for the county was $16,189.  About 8.30% of families and 12.50% of the population were below the poverty line, including 15.00% of those under age 18 and 13.10% of those age 65 or over.

2020 Census

Education

Public schools
Atlanta C-3 School District – Atlanta
Atlanta Elementary School (K-06)
Atlanta High School (07-12)
Bevier C-4 School District – Bevier
 Bevier Elementary School (K-08)
Bevier High School (09-12)
Callao C-8 School District – Callao
Callao Elementary School (K-08)
La Plata R-II School District – La Plata
La Plata Elementary School (PK-06)
La Plata High School (07-12)
Macon County R-I School District – Macon
Macon Elementary School (PK-05)
Macon Middle School (06-08)
Macon High School (09-12)
Macon County R-IV School District – New Cambria
Macon County Elementary School (K-06)
Macon County High School (07-12)

Private schools
Tri County Christian School – Macon (PK-06) – Nondenominational Christian
Immaculate Conception School – Macon (K-08) – Roman Catholic

Public libraries
 Laplata Public Library
Macon Public Library

Politics

Local
The accompanying table (below right) shows the county elected officials and their party affiliation. As is tradition, the majority ran as Republicans.

State

All of Macon County is in district 6 of the Missouri House of Representatives, represented by Tim Remole (R-Excello).

All of Macon County is a part of Missouri's 18th District in the Missouri Senate and is currently represented by Brian Munzingler (R-Williamstown).

Federal

All of Macon County is included in Missouri's 6th Congressional District and is currently represented by Sam Graves (R-St. Tarkio) in the U.S. House of Representatives.

Presidential Election Results

Communities

Cities
Atlanta
Bevier
Callao
Elmer
Ethel
La Plata
Macon (county seat)
New Cambria

Village
South Gifford

Census-designated place
Excello

Other unincorporated places
Anabel
Ardmore
Axtell
Barnesville
Barryville
Bloomington
Cardy
College Mound
Cottage
Cox
Economy
Goldsberry
Hammack
Kaseyville
Kellogg
Keota
Kern
Lingo
Love Lake
Mercyville
Nickellton
Redman
Seney
Sue City
Ten Mile
Walnut
Woodville

Ghost towns
Hart in Russell Township
Longville
Tullvania

See also
National Register of Historic Places listings in Macon County, Missouri

References

External links
 Digitized 1930 Plat Book of Macon County  from University of Missouri Division of Special Collections, Archives, and Rare Books

 
1837 establishments in Missouri
Populated places established in 1837